Clinton Commercial Historic District is a national historic district located at Clinton, Sampson County, North Carolina.  The district encompasses 67 contributing buildings and 4 contributing objects in the central business district of Clinton.  It developed between about 1902 and 1951, and includes notable examples of Colonial Revival, Tudor Revival, and Classical Revival architecture.  Located in the district are the separately listed Bethune-Powell Buildings, Clinton Depot, and Johnson Building.  Other notable buildings include the Sampson County Courthouse (1904, 1937-1939), Bank of Sampson (1902), Henry Vann Building (1924), William's Building (c. 1935), DuBose Building (1938), and U. S. Post Office (1936) designed by the Office of the Supervising Architect under Louis A. Simon.

It was added to the National Register of Historic Places in 2002.

References

Historic districts on the National Register of Historic Places in North Carolina
Colonial Revival architecture in North Carolina
Tudor Revival architecture in North Carolina
Neoclassical architecture in North Carolina
Buildings and structures in Sampson County, North Carolina
National Register of Historic Places in Sampson County, North Carolina